Dan Morgenstern (born October 24, 1929) is a jazz writer, editor, archivist, and producer. He is the son of the German-language Jewish author Soma Morgenstern.

Morgenstern was raised in Vienna and Copenhagen and arrived in the United States in 1947. He wrote for Jazz Journal from 1958 to 1961, then edited several jazz magazines: Metronome in 1961, Jazz from 1962 to 1963, and Down Beat from 1967 to 1973. In 1976, he was named director of Rutgers–Newark's Institute of Jazz Studies, where he continued the work of Marshall Stearns and made the Institute the world's largest collection of jazz documents, recordings, and memorabilia.

Over the course of his career, Morgenstern has arranged concerts (including the Jazz in the Garden series at the Museum of Modern Art); produced and hosted television and radio programs; taught jazz history at universities and conservatories; and served as a panelist for jazz festivals and awards across the U.S. and Europe.

Morgenstern is known as a prolific writer of comprehensive, authoritative liner notes, a sideline that has garnered him eight Grammy Awards for Best Album Notes since 1973.

Morgenstern is the author of two books: Jazz People (1976); and Living with Jazz (2004), a reader edited by Sheldon Meyer (1926-2006). Both were winners of ASCAP's Deems Taylor Award.

In 2007, Morgenstern received the A.B. Spellman Jazz Masters Award for Jazz Advocacy from the National Endowment for the Arts.

Grammy Awards for Best Album Notes
Art Tatum, God Is in the House (1973)
Coleman Hawkins, The Hawk Flies (1974)
Various (Savoy Records collection), The Changing Face of Harlem (1976)
Erroll Garner, Erroll Garner: Master of the Keyboard (1981)
Clifford Brown, Brownie: The Complete Emarcy Recordings of Clifford Brown (1990)
Louis Armstrong, Portrait of the Artist as a Young Man (1994)
Fats Waller, If You Got to Ask, You Ain't Got It! (2006)
Louis Armstrong, The Complete Louis Armstrong Decca Sessions (1935-1946) (2010)

References

1929 births
Living people
Grammy Award winners
American music critics
Discographers